"Meddler" is a science fiction short story by American writer Philip K. Dick. It was first published in Future Science Fiction, October 1954 with illustration by Virgil Finlay.  Dick had submitted many short stories to magazines and made approximately fifteen sales before becoming a client of the Scott Meredith Literary Agency. This was his second SMLA submission, received by SMLA on July 24, 1952. His first SMLA submission was The Builder, received by SMLA on July 23, 1952.

Synopsis

A government Council illegally makes Time Dips into the future with escalation of adverse consequences following each time-dip. The protagonist, Hasten, is sent in a Time Car as a last-ditch attempt to learn how this meddling worked its destructive force and how to correct the problem. Hasten eventually learns his return trip is apparently the ultimate cause.

About the story

In 1978, Dick said about "Meddler":

References

External links 
 

Short stories by Philip K. Dick
Works originally published in Future Science Fiction and Science Fiction Stories
1954 short stories